Trombidium geniculatum is a species of mite in the genus Trombidium in the family Trombidiidae. It is found in Spain, Romania, Poland and Norway.

Name
The species name is derived from Latin genicula "knee".

References
 Synopsis of the described Arachnida of the World: Trombidiidae

Further reading
  (1955): Acarina. Trombidiidae. Fauna Republicii Populare Romine

Trombidiidae
Animals described in 1955
Arachnids of Europe